The 1972 USLTA Indoor Circuit  was a professional tennis circuit held in the United States that year. It consisted of 14 tournaments and was organized by Bill Riordan and sanctioned by the United States Lawn Tennis Association (USLTA).

Players who reached at least the quarter-finals of the six top tournaments received ranking points. Ilie Năstase won the first prize of $15,000 from a total bonus pool of $50,000 which was linked to the Boise Cascade Classic series of 13 U.S. indoor tournaments.

Schedule

January

February

March

December

See also
 1972 Grand Prix circuit
 1972 World Championship Tennis circuit

Notes

References

Tennis tournaments in the United States
USLTA Indoor Circuit
USLTA Indoor Circuit seasons